or  is a strait located in Tromsø Municipality in Troms og Finnmark county, Norway. The strait is crossed by the Tromsøysund Tunnel (E8 highway) and by the Tromsø Bridge. The strait connects to the Balsfjorden and Straumsfjorden to the south and into the Kvalsundet and Grøtsundet straits to the north.

References

Tromsø
Landforms of Troms og Finnmark
Straits of Norway